Rabindranath Tagore Secondary School is a secondary school in Mauritius.

References

Secondary schools in Mauritius
Educational institutions with year of establishment missing